Alledonia is an unincorporated community in central Washington Township, Belmont County, Ohio, United States.  It has a post office with the ZIP code 43902.  It lies along State Route 148.

Alledonia is part of the Wheeling, WV-OH Metropolitan Statistical Area.

References

Unincorporated communities in Belmont County, Ohio
Unincorporated communities in Ohio